RUN domain-containing protein 3A is a protein that in humans is encoded by the RUNDC3A gene.

Interactions 

RUNDC3A has been shown to interact with RAP2A.

See also 
 RUN domain

References

Further reading